Originally conceived on April 21, 1950 as a not-for-profit theatrical organization, the Springfield Municipal Opera Association transformed a 55-acre wheat field into an outdoor amphitheater. On June 17, 1950, nearly 3,000 people viewed the opening night performance of its first production, The Merry Widow.

The Muni flourished until a series of setbacks in the mid-1950s and a major fire in 1963 destroyed part of the facilities. A second fire the following year destroyed what was left.

With hopes for a rebirth, a test production of Bye Bye Birdie was staged in Douglas Park in 1964. The Springfield community responded with such enthusiasm that the Muni was able to rebuild its facility and return to the lake site theater in 1965. That year, over 6,000 patrons saw The Music Man and South Pacific.

In 1967, the Muni produced three shows; Brigadoon, Guys and Dolls and Camelot and attendance grew to 14,375. Muni bravely staged its first four-production season in 1972; You're a Good Man, Charlie Brown, 1776, The Most Happy Fella, The Sound of Music and attendance jumped to over 17,000.

In 2006, the Muni welcomed its one millionth patron during the run of Elton John and Tim Rice's Aida with a special celebration on July 29.

The Muni continues to produce four shows a season and has become one of the largest community theaters in the Midwest. It is believed to be the largest organization of this type in the country that is completely self-supporting, dependent neither on grants nor tax dollars.

Springfield Municipal Opera Répertoire 1964-2022 

Here follows a list of the many shows that The Springfield Municipal Opera has presented in its summer seasons.

Chronological Listing

1964 
 Bye Bye, Birdie 
 Test production staged at Douglas Park to see if enough community interest could be generated to rebuild the old lake site after 2 fires wiped out the facilities

1960s

1965 (Season 1) 
 The Music Man
 South Pacific

1966 (Season 2) 
 My Fair Lady
 Pajama Game

1967 (Season 3) 
 Brigadoon
 Guys & Dolls
 Camelot

1968 (Season 4) 
 Unsinkable Molly Brown, The
 Oliver!
 Kiss Me, Kate

1969 (Season 5) 
 Bells Are Ringing
 Gypsy
 Annie Get Your Gun

1970s

1970 (Season 6) 
 Li'l Abner
 A Funny Thing Happened on the Way to the Forum
 Man of La Mancha

1971 (Season 7) 
 Funny Girl
 King and I, The
 Fiddler on the Roof

1972 (Season 8) 
 You're A Good Man, Charlie Brown
 1776
 Most Happy Fella, The
 Sound of Music, The

1973 (Season 9) 
 Once Upon A Mattress
 Carnival!
 Promises, Promises
 Oklahoma!

1974 (Season 10) 
 On A Clear Day You Can See Forever
 Hello, Dolly!
 Applause
 Music Man, The

1975 (Season 11) 
 Guys & Dolls
 How To Succeed In Business (Without Really Trying)
 Fiddler On the Roof
 Mame

1976 (Season 12) 
 1776
 Irene
 Bye Bye, Birdie
 Calamity Jane
Bicentennial production featuring Robert Alda as Benjamin Franklin and underwritten by Franklin Life Insurance Company.  Many cast members of the 1972 production reprised their roles in this show.

1977 (Season 13) 
 Cinderella
 Desert Song, The
 West Side Story
 My Fair Lady

1978 (Season 14) 
 Sweet Charity
 Brigadoon
 Paint Your Wagon
 I Do! I Do!

1979 (Season 15) 
 Shenandoah
 No, No, Nanette
 Pajama Game, The
 Carousel
The Muni's 50th production

1980s

1980 (Season 16) 
 South Pacific
 Good News
 Gypsy
 Show Boat

1981 (Season 17) 
 Camelot
 Grease
 Oklahoma!
 A Little Night Music

1982 (Season 18) 
 Kismet
 George M!
 Oliver!
 Follies

1983 (Season 19) 
 King and I, The
 Joseph and the Amazing Technicolor® Dreamcoat
 Student Prince, The
 Hello, Dolly!

1984 (Season 20) 
 Peter Pan
 Funny Girl
 Two Gentlement of Verona
 Music Man, The

1985 (Season 21) 
 Annie
 Damn Yankees
 You're A Good Man, Charlie Brown
 Evita

1986 (Season 22) 
 Sound of Music, The
 Jesus Christ Superstar
 Cabaret
 Seven Brides for Seven Brothers

1987 (Season 23) 
 Annie Get Your Gun
 Wiz, The
 Promises, Promises
 Gigi

1988 (Season 24) 
 Peter Pan
 South Pacific
 42nd Street
 Mame

1989 (Season 25) 
 Joseph and the Amazing Technicolor® Dreamcoat
 Fiddler on the Roof
 Singin' in the Rain
 My Fair Lady

1990s

1990 (Season 26) 
 Oklahoma!
 Teddy & Alice
 Anything Goes
 Camelot

1991 (Season 27) 
 Oliver!
 My One and Only
 Into the Woods
 Show Boat
The Muni's 100th production

1992 (Season 28) 
 Man of La Mancha
 Dreamgirls
 Me and My Girl
 Unsinkable Molly Brown, The

1993 (Season 29) 
 Hans Christian Andersen 
 Sugar
 Pirates of Penzance, The
 Brigadoon
 The 1981 Joseph Papp revival version

1994 (Season 30) 
 Peter Pan
 Hello, Dolly!
 Big River
 Carousel

1995 (Season 31) 
 King and I, The
 Meet Me in St. Louis
 City of Angels
 Gypsy

1996 (Season 32) 
 Phantom
 Will Rogers Follies, The
 Little Me
 Wizard of Oz, The

1997 (Season 33) 
 Guys & Dolls
 Crazy for You
 Secret Garden, The
 Kiss Me, Kate

1998 (Season 34) 
 Fiddler on the Roof
 Bye Bye, Birdie
 Godspell
 Annie

1999 (Season 35) 
 State Fair
 42nd Street
 Goodbye Girl, The
 Sound of Music, The

2000s

2000 (Season 36) 
 Cinderella
 Grease
 Children of Eden
 Music Man, The

2001 (Season 37)
 How To Succeed In Business (Without Really Trying)
 A Little Night Music
 West Side Story
 Peter Pan
 First season without a Muni premiere production

2002 (Season 38) 
 Joseph and the Amazing Technicolor® Dreamcoat
 Anything Goes
 Mame
 South Pacific

2003 (Season 39) 
 Titanic
 Big
 My Fair Lady
 Wizard of Oz, The

2004 (Season 40) 
 Honk!
 Seven Brides for Seven Brothers
 A Chorus Line
 Big River
The Muni's 150th production

2005 (Season 41) 
 Sound of Music, The
 Ragtime
 Annie Get Your Gun
 Beauty and the Beast

2006 (Season 42) 
 Annie Warbucks
 Chicago
 Aida
 King and I, The
 The Muni welcomed its one millionth patron with a special celebration on July 29, 2006.

2007 (Season 43) 
 Miss Saigon
 Peter Pan
 Grease
 Oklahoma!

2008 (Season 44) 
 Hello, Dolly!
 All Shook Up
 Secret Garden, The
 Music Man, The

2009 (Season 45) 
 Oliver!
 Producers, The
 Fiddler on the Roof
 High School Musical

2010s

2010 (Season 46) 
 Seussical
 Into the Woods
 Jesus Christ Superstar
 Annie

2011 (Season 47) 
 Big River
 Guys & Dolls
 Hairspray
 Wizard of Oz, The

2012 (Season 48) 
 Joseph and the Amazing Technicolor® Dreamcoat
 Crazy for You
 Once On This Island
 Beauty and the Beast

2013 (Season 49) 
 Les Misérables
 Dreamgirls
 Peter Pan
 Rent

2014 (Season 50) 
 Sound of Music, The
 All Shook Up
 Shrek
 Jekyll & Hyde

2015 (Season 51) 
 Spamalot
 Seussical
 West Side Story
 Cabaret

2016 (Season 52) 
 South Pacific
 Sweeney Todd--The Demon Barber of Fleet Street
 Nice Work If You Can Get It
 Little Mermaid, The

2017 (Season 53) 
 Willie Wonka
 Mary Poppins
 White Christmas
 Grease
The Muni's 200th production at the lake site amphitheater

2018 (Season 54) 
 Little Shop of Horrors
 Sister Act
 Legally Blonde
 Annie

2019 (Season 55) 
 Peter Pan 
 Evita
 Thoroughly Modern Millie
 Wizard of Oz, The

2020s

2020 (Season 56)

ALL PRODUCTIONS POSTPONED UNTIL SUMMER OF 2021 DUE TO COVID-19 PANDEMIC 
 The Addams Family
 Ragtime
 Mamma Mia!
 Matilda

2021 (Season 57)

All 4 shows cancelled for summer 2021 due to ongoing coronavirus pandemic
 The Addams Family
 Ragtime
 Mamma Mia!
 Matilda

2022 (Season 58) 
 SpongeBob Musical, The
 Ragtime
 Newsies
 Matilda

2023 (Season 59) 
 TBA June 2-4, 7-10, 2023
 Rock of Ages, June 23-25, 28-July 1, 2023
 Beauty and the Beast, July 14-16, 19-22, 2023
 School of Rock, August 4-6, 9-12, 2023

Alphabetical Listing 

1776--                            1972, 1976
42nd Street--                     1988, 1999
A Chorus Line--                   2004
A Funny Thing Happened on the Way to the Forum-- 1970
A Little Night Music--            1981, 2001
Addams Family, The--  2020 (Postponed), 2021 (Canceled)
Aida--                            2006
All Shook Up--                    2008, 2014
Annie--                           1985, 1998, 2010, 2018
Annie Get Your Gun--              1969, 1987, 2005
Annie Warbucks--			2006
Anything Goes--			1990, 2002
Applause--			1974
Beauty and the Beast--		2005, 2012, 2023
Bells Are Ringing--		1969
Big--				2003
Big River--			1994, 2004, 2011
Brigadoon--			1967, 1978, 1993
Bye Bye, Birdie-- 		1964, 1976, 1998
Cabaret--				1986, 2015
Calamity Jane-- 			1976
Camelot--				1967, 1981, 1990
Carnival!--			1973
Carousel-- 			1979, 1994
Chicago--				2006
Children of Eden--		2000
Cinderella--			1977, 2000
City of Angels--			1995
Crazy for You--			1997, 2012
Damn Yankees--			1985
Desert Song, The--		1977
Dreamgirls--			1992, 2013
Evita-- 				1985, 2019
Fiddler on the Roof--		1971, 1975, 1989, 1998, 2009, 2023
Follies-- 			1982
Funny Girl--			1971, 1984
George M!--			1982
Gigi-- 				1987
Godspell--			1998
Good News--			1980
Goodbye Girl, The--		1999
Grease--				1981, 2000, 2007, 2017
Guys & Dolls--			1967, 1975, 1997, 2011
Gypsy--				1969, 1980, 1995
Hairspray--			2011
Hans Christian Andersen--		1993
Hello, Dolly!--			1974, 1983, 1994, 2008
High School Musical--		2009
Honk!--				2004
How To Succeed In Business (Without Really Trying)--	1975, 2001
I Do! I Do!-- 			1978
Into the Woods--			1991, 2010
Irene--1976
Jekyll & Hyde--2014
Jesus Christ Superstar--		1986, 2010
Joseph and the Amazing Technicolor® Dreamcoat--	1983, 1989, 2002, 2012
King and I, The--			1971, 1983, 1995, 2006
Kismet--				1982
Kiss Me, Kate-- 			1968, 1997
Legally Blonde-- 			2018
Les Misérables--			2013
Li'l Abner--			1970
Little Me--			1996
Little Mermaid, The--			2016
Little Shop of Horrors--		2018
Mamma Mia!--                    2020 (Postponed), 2021 (Canceled)
Mame-- 				1975, 1988, 2002
Man of La Mancha-- 		1970, 1992
Mary Poppins-- 	2017
Matilda--                        2020 (Postponed), 2021 (Postponed), 2022
Me and My Girl--			1992
Meet Me in St. Louis--		1995
Miss Saigon--			2007
Most Happy Fella, The--		1972
Music Man, The--			1965, 1974, 1984, 2000, 2008
My Fair Lady--			1966, 1977, 1989, 2003
My One and Only--			1991
Newsies--			2022
Nice Work If You Can Get It--		2016
No, No, Nanette--			1979
Oklahoma!--			1973, 1981, 1990, 2007
Oliver!--				1968, 1982, 1991, 2009
On a Clear Day You Can See Forever--		1974
Once On This Island--		2012
Once Upon a Mattress--		1973
Paint Your Wagon--		1978
Pajama Game, The--			1966, 1979
Peter Pan--			1984, 1988, 1994, 2001, 2007, 2013, 2019
Phantom--				1996
Pirates of Penzance, The--		1993
Producers, The--			2009
Promises, Promises--		1973, 1987
Ragtime--				2005, 2020 (Postponed), 2021 (Postponed), 2022
Rent--                           2013
Rock of Ages,--			2023
School of Rock,--			2023
Secret Garden, The--		1997, 2008
Seussical--			2010, 2015
Seven Brides for Seven Brothers--		1986, 2004
Shenandoah--			1979
Show Boat--			1980, 1991
Shrek--			        2014
Singin' in the Rain--		1989
Sister Act--			2018
Sound of Music, The--		1972, 1986, 1999, 2005, 2014
South Pacific-- 			1965, 1980, 1988, 2002, 2016
Spamalot--			2015
SpongeBob Musical, The--			2022
State Fair--			1999
Student Prince, The--		1983
Sugar--				1993
Sweeney Todd--The Demon Barber of Fleet Street--			2016
Sweet Charity--			1978
Teddy & Alice--			1990
Thoroughly Modern Millie--	2019
Titanic--				2003
Two Gentlemen of Verona--		1984
Unsinkable Molly Brown, The--	1968, 1992
West Side Story--			1977, 2001, 2015
White Christmas-- 		2017
Will Rogers Follies, The--	1996
Willie Wonka--	2017
Wiz, The--			1987
Wizard of Oz, The--		1996, 2003, 2011, 2019
You're A Good Man, Charlie Brown--		1972, 1985

See also
List of contemporary amphitheaters

Sources 
 Programs from recent Muni Opera productions

External links 
 Springfield Municipal Opera

Springfield, Illinois
Tourist attractions in Springfield, Illinois